Tim Wilson is an Australian canoe sailor.

Wilson was part of the Australian team (together with Hayden Virtue and Seth Dunbar) that won the 2008 International Canoe Challenge Cup by successfully challenging the current holders Great Britain, represented by Colin Brown, John Robson and Simon Allen.

Career highlights 

 2008
 Port Phillip, winner, International Canoe Challenge Cup

References

External links 
 Australia have won the International Canoe Challenge Cup

Australian male sailors (sport)
Australian male canoeists
Living people
Year of birth missing (living people)